Edward Boys may refer to:

Sir Edward Boys (MP) (1579–1646), MP for Fowey, Christchurch, Sandwich and Dover
Edward Boys (Royal Navy officer) (1785–1866), English sea captain
Edward James Boys (1916–2002), English military author
Edward Boys (priest) (1599–1667), English divine and author of sermons

See also
Edward Boyse (1923–2007), British-born, American physician and biologist